The 1905 Grant football team was an American football team that represented the Chattanooga campus of  U. S. Grant Memorial University (now known as the University of Tennessee at Chattanooga) during the 1905 college football season. In its second year under head coach Walter Hullihen, the team compiled a 6–1 record.

Schedule

References

Grant
Chattanooga Mocs football seasons
Grant football